The U-18 Men's Softball World Cup (in spanish: Campeonato Mundial juvenil de softball masculino) is a fastpitch softball tournament for age 19-and-under national teams held every four years by the World Baseball Softball Confederation, formerly the International Softball Federation (ISF).

Results

Medal table

See also
 U-18 Women’s Softball World Cup

References

World championships in softball
World Baseball Softball Confederation competitions
Under-18 sport